García Sánchez I (Basque: Gartzea I.a Santxez; c. 919 – 22 February 970), was the king of Pamplona from 925 until his death in 970. He was the second king of the Jiménez dynasty, succeeding his father when he was merely six years old.

Biography 
Son of Sancho I and Toda Aznárez, he succeeded his father in 925 when he was only six years old and reigned under the tutelage of his uncle Jimeno Garcés and of his mother, Toda. Three of García's sisters married kings of León: Urraca married Ramiro II; Oneca was the wife of Alfonso IV; and Sancha Sánchez was first married to Ordoño II. After Ordoño's death, she became the wife of Álvaro Herraméliz, Count of Álava, and after his death married Fernán González, Count of Castile. Another sister, Velasquita, married Munio Vélaz, who was Álvaro Herraméliz's predecessor as count of Álava. According to historian Gonzalo Martínez Díez, "the intimate family ties of the Navarrese dynasty with the monarchs of León and with the counts of Castile and Álava, would be reflected in the battlefield where soldiers from Pamplona frequently fought side by side with the Leonese and Castilians against a common enemy, Islam". Thanks to this web of alliances crafted by Queen Toda, Pamplona was able to increase its power and play a key role in the affairs of the Christian kingdoms of the Iberian Peninsula.

Upon the death of his uncle and tutor, Jimeno Garcés, on 29 May 931, another uncle, Íñigo Garcés, half-brother of García's father, Sancho I, probably tried to become the regent of the kingdom and perhaps even usurp the throne, to the detriment of his nephew's rights. Both García and his mother Toda appear in a charter at the Abbey of San Pedro de Siresa on 9 March 933 without the royal titles. A year later, in May 934, the Caliph of Córdoba, Abd-ar-Rahman III, led a military expedition against King Ramiro II of León. The Caliph's original intention was to penetrate Castile, but he changed his plans when the Tujibid governor of Zaragoza, Muhammad ibn Hashim, refused to join forces. His armies first attacked the fortress in Maluenda and then ibn Hashim's fortress in Rueda de Jalón. When Abd-ar-Rahman was about to penetrate the Kingdom of Pamplona, he received an embassy from Toda asking him to withdraw his troops, and also reminding him of the family ties that bound them. The objective of Toda's embassy to his nephew Abd-ar-Rahman III could also have been to seek his protection for herself and her son and to have the Caliph "expressly recognize her son, the young monarch García Sánchez I". This would have secured García the crown in the face of possible counterclaimants (such as Íñigo Garcés).

Abd-ar-Rahman, who had never met his aunt, imposed the condition that she was to meet him at his camp in Calahorra "as proof of the sincerity of her motives". She accepted and went to meet him. As described by historian Ibn Hayyan, as part of the "pact of submission and vassalage", she was to submit to him and detach herself from the other Christian rulers, allies, and relatives, desist from supporting them, and do nothing to hurt the Muslims. She was also to allow free passage to his armies through the Kingdom of Pamplona and had to liberate the Muslim hostages that she had as a pledge for a payment due to her. She consented to all of his demands and he, in turn, gave her son, García, Pamplona and all of its districts in investiture. She left on the same day taking with her the rich presents that he had given her. Shortly afterwards, the Muslim armies rapidly crossed the territory under the Pamplonese monarchy so as not to cause damage, and attacked the neighboring Álava and Castile, attacking  the fortress in Grañón. They burned crops, chopped down fruit trees, and destroyed vineyards and buildings along the way.

In 937, King García allied himself with Ramiro II of León and Muhammad ibn Hashim, governor of Zaragoza, resulting in a military campaign by Abd-ar-Rahman III via Calatayud and Zaragoza into García's lands. He participated in July 939 in the Battle of Simancas alongside Ramiro II and Fernán González with the Christian armies defeating the caliphal forces. After this reversal, Abd-ar-Rahman III was planning another expedition for March 940 but suspended all plans when he received a messenger from Ramiro II to negotiate a truce. The Caliph, in response, also sent an envoy to the Leonese court for the negotiations. At about the same time or sometime before, he had also begun talks with Sunyer, Count of Barcelona, the result of which was a two-year truce. The accord, very advantageous for the Christians in commercial terms, included several conditions, one of which was the cancellation of the plans (or the annulment) of the marriage of King García with Count Sunyer's daughter. The peace negotiations between King Ramiro II and Abd-ar-Rahman III were not concluded until the summer of 941. The peace included "all the frontier communities between the kingdoms of Leon and Pamplona, from Santarém to Huesca since Ramiro had a great interest in including García Sánchez I, the king who governed the destinies of the Pyrenean kingdom, rather than leaving him in the hands of Abd-ar-Rahman as the only Christian ruler remaining in a state of war with the Cordoban caliphate".

Following the death of Ramiro II and his successor Ordoño III of León, the Pamplona kingdom threw support behind the deceased king's younger brother, Sancho I of León, who was García's nephew. When García's brother-in-law, later also his son-in-law, and ally Fernán González of Castile switched his support and installed his own son-in-law Ordoño IV of León in place of Sancho, Fernán's relationship with García became strained and the death of Fernán's wife, García's sister Sancha, the next year led to a break. García directly intervened in León, capturing Fernán and restoring Sancho. Fernán was forced to make territorial concessions to García to gain his release and their alliance wasn't fully restored until 964, when Fernán remarried, this time to García's daughter Urraca.

He died on 22 February 970 and was interred in the castle of San Esteban de Deyo in Villamayor de Monjardín, Navarre.

Marriage and children 
García married his first cousin Andregoto Galíndez, daughter of Galindo Aznárez II, Count of Aragon and his wife Sancha Garcés. Given that Galindo Aznárez II did not have any legitimate male heirs, the rights to the County of Aragon passed down to Andregoto, and then to her first son with García Sánchez, as a county within the Kingdom of Pamplona.

The following children were born of this marriage:
 Sancho II of Pamplona, King of Pamplona and Count of Aragon until his death in 994. He was married to his first cousin, Urraca Fernández, daughter of Fernán González of Castile, Count of Castile and his wife Sancha Sánchez, who was Sancho's paternal aunt.
 Toda Garcés

Andregoto was repudiated by her husband in 942. She retired to her lands in Aibar where she died sometime after June 971.

The King had reached an agreement to marry the daughter of Sunyer, Count of Barcelona, but the forced submission of Sunyer to Abd-ar-Rahman included the abandonment of this plan. By 943, García had married Teresa of León, daughter of his ally King Ramiro II of León and Adosinda Gutiérrez. They had the following children:

 Ramiro Garcés of Viguera (died 981), first King of Viguera.
 Jimeno Garcés
 Urraca Garcés (died before 1008), was the second wife of Fernán González, Count of Castile, and, after his death, married to count William Sánchez of Gascony.

Ancestry

Notes

References

Bibliography

Secondary sources

Primary sources

 
 
 

910s births
970 deaths
10th-century Navarrese monarchs
House of Jiménez
Medieval child monarchs
Sons of emperors
fi:Garcia II (Pamplona)